Norville is an unincorporated community in Livingston County, in the U.S. state of Missouri.

History
A post office called Norville was established in 1892, and remained in operation until 1906. The community most likely has the name of Captain William N. Norville, an early citizen.

References

Unincorporated communities in Livingston County, Missouri
Unincorporated communities in Missouri